Tel Qashish, also spelled Tel Kashish (from the ) or Tell el-Qassis in Arabic, is a tell, or archaeological mound, located in the northwestern section of the Jezreel Valley, on the north bank of the Kishon River. The ancient settlement at Tel Qashish is considered a daughter of the ancient city of Yokneam, some 2 kilometres south of Tel Qashish. Yohanan Aharoni Identified the site with "Helkath" from the list of 119 cities conquered by Pharaoh Thutmose III. According to other studies, the site should be identified with "Dabeshet" from the Book of Joshua. Next to the mound is a spring called Ein Qashish, with remains of prehistorical human activity from the Middle Palaeolithic.

Geography

Tel Qashish is situated on the north bank of the Kishon River, where the stream bends and bounds the site from its southern and western sides. This poses an excellent strategic position, next to Tel Yokneam some 2 km away, the major site in the region, on which Tel Qashish was most probably dependent. The mound covers an area of 10.7 acres (or around 43 dunams/4.3 ha) and has an elongated shape, 270 meters long, 160 meters wide at its base. Its western half is about 5 meters higher than the eastern half. The mound slopes steeply on all sides, except on the northeast, where the approach road to the site was probably located.

During most of the Jezreel Valley's history, the majority of the sites, including Tel Qashish, were located on the edges of the valley and not in its middle. One reason for this may be drainage problems which cause soil instability. Another reason may be the presence of seasonal swamps, and another is the difficulty to defend against a human threat.

Archaeology
Farmers from nearby agricultural settlements annually plowed the surface of the tell, causing damage to the remains of the later settlements on the mound, and in some cases even affecting Late Bronze Age remains.

Ein Qashish - Palaeolithic (Mousterian)
Excavations at Ein Qashish have uncovered multiple campsites of the Mousterian culture (70,000–60,000 BCE) containing animal bones and flint tools. The site has a number of archaeological layers, which implies humans were drawn to this site during the Middle and Upper Palaeolithic periods. The humans who camped there, probably for short periods during summertime, when the Kishon river does not flood, were mostly hunting, based on the remains of animal bones there. Just like other sites of this kind, they left many man-made stone tools. According to a study, the flint was imported to the site from a more western area, next to Mount Carmel. One unique discovery was a cluster of human bones and remains of clay paint indicating some unusual, maybe ritual activity. Neanderthal remains have been found at the site, with dating techniques indicating that they frequently visited the area from 70,000-60,000 BP.

Neolithic
Flint tools, including microliths and arrow-heads from the Neolithic period (12,000–4,500 BCE) were uncovered sitting on the mound's bedrock.

Early Bronze Age
Tel Qashish's earliest unearthed settlement is from the Early Bronze Age I period (3300–3000 BCE). The settlement seems to have been unfortified and seemingly covered the largest area in the sites' history. Not enough remains were unearthed to determine the plan of the settlement, but the randomly placed, one-room houses hint a dense plan, similar to other sites of that period. The ceramics are mostly of domestic Canaanite ware. Due to its location on an international trade route, it is mostly influenced from northern, possibly Lebanese cultures. The settlement was self-sustaining, based on agriculture.

Unlike all other sites in the Jezreel Valley, Tel Qashish was not depopulated during the transition between the Early Bronze Age I to the Early Bronze Age II period (3000–2700 BCE), maybe due to its strategic location. In the transition between the periods, the settlement shrank and no longer covered the mound's surrounding area, but only occupied the mound itself. Unlike the Early Bronze Age I settlement, the new settlement was planned and fortified. A difference in the plan of the structures between the lower part and upper part of the mound may indicate a social structure that distinguishes the residents of the upper and lower settlement. This, however, is not seen in the ceramic findings, which include mostly plates, bowls and jars. The settlement had a small pottery industry, probably at the household level. As it seems, the villagers didn't own many luxury items - only a carnelian bead and a decorated bone from the entire Early Bronze Age were found.

The transition to the Early Bronze Age III period (2700–2200 BCE) was peaceful and gradual. The village plan remained pretty much the same. Some extensions of the fortification plan were made, rooms were enlarged and installations were built. The village was probably abandoned sometime before the end of the Early Bronze Age III period as no signs of destruction are seen. It was about this time that the nearby, much more significant settlement at Tel Yokneam began. The villagers may probably choose to move to the nearby settlement, located on a better-defended position. Another reason may be the unstable political status of that time, as cities competed against each other due to the halt in economic ties with Egypt during Early Bronze Age II period.

Agriculture was important in the Early Bronze Age settlement. This is seen in the stone objects from this period, of which 40% are sickle blades. Intensive sharpening and retouching are signs of their intensive use. The remains of edible plants include olive, barley, wheat and vetch seeds. These were probably grown next to the mound. These crops (excluding vetch) were being grown throughout the entire Early Bronze Age period (3300–2200 BCE).

Middle Bronze Age
The settlement at Tel Qashish was rebuilt in the Middle Bronze Age. The first supposed layer of that period includes only floors and no clear architectural elements such as buildings or walls. A considerable amount of pottery was found on these floors, and there is a possibility that other buildings or a defensive system from this layer are located outside of the excavation area. The ceramics date this layer to end of the Middle Bronze Age IIA period (2000–1750 BCE), meaning Tel Qashish was not settled for almost 500 years, or at least, very poorly settled.

During the transition period between the Middle Bronze Age IIA and IIB, a fortified settlement was built at Tel Qashish. The wall was made of stone, was 1.7 meters wide and featured a glacis. One of the wall's towers was discovered. The residents of this settlement buried the dead in a common Canaanite way, by placing the dead in jars and interring them in a tomb. Two tombs were found well preserved, one of a two-year-old infant, and the other of a forty-years-old female.

Late Bronze Age
After the transition to the Late Bronze Age I period (1550 – 1400 BCE), the Middle Bronze Age fortifications system went out of use and houses were built on top of it, with thicker walls than in previous periods.

A small cave was discovered north of the mound with ceramics from the Late Bronze Age II period (1400–1200 BCE). The cave is 3 meters long, 1.4 – 2 meters wide and is up to 3 meters high. Its ceiling has collapsed in ancient times. The cave contains some 200 complete ritual tools. Six high pedestals with "windows" were found. These probably served as a base for other ceramics and their high shape, with a height of 60–80 cm, and the "windows" may indicate that they represent towers. Some 40 goblets were discovered. One particular goblet has a very detailed shape of a face. These finds indicate a minor ritual activity for probably a short period of time, conveniently during an era of peace.

Iron Age
The Iron Age remains were severely damaged and its remains are poor. With this remains, it is notable that Tel Qashish at the Iron Age was much less significant than in the Bronze Age. The settlement during the early Iron Age (1200 – 1000 BCE) was a farm with a few structures. Most of the remains were found on the higher part of the mound, which may suggest it was the main part of this small village. During the late Iron Age (1000 – 539 BCE) the village expanded to occupy both the higher and lower parts of the mound. The ceramics from this period included pottery that was most likely used for rituals rather than everyday use.

Later periods
The site may have been occupied during the Persian period (539–332 BCE), but only minor findings from this period were discovered in pits. Same goes for the Hellenistic period (332–70 BCE), which left a few coins. On the surface, some remains from the Mamluk and Ottoman periods were found on the ground. These represent some human activity, but with that said, no architectural remains from any of these periods were found.

The site was used during the 1947–1949 Palestine war as a military post. Defensive positions and trenches were dug and a concrete bunker built at the highest point is still there today.

History of archaeological research
British archaeologist John Garstang conducted a trial excavation in the 1920s. In two trenches he found exclusively Early Bronze Age pottery (3300–2100 BCE). German-Israeli archaeologist Raphael Giveon surveyed the site in the early 1950s and found pottery ranging from the Middle Bronze Age (2100–1550 BCE) to the Hellenistic period (330–31 BCE). Avner Raban surveyed the site in the 1970s and confirmed Giveon's findings, as part of the Yoqne'am Regional Project that surveyed Tel Yokneam and Tel Qiri in addition to Tel Qashish and a survey of the western Jezreel Valley. Eight seasons of extensive excavation were conducted between 1978 and 1987. They were headed by Amnon Ben-Tor and sponsored by the Institute of Archaeology of the Hebrew University of Jerusalem and the Israel Exploration Society. In February 2004 a team of the Israel Antiquities Authority discovered the site of Ein Qashish, some 100 meters south of the mound and the Kishon River. The site was surveyed before a major road and railway project was undertaken. Flint tools from the Middle Palaeolithic period were found scattered. In 2010 the Israel Antiquities Authority has conducted a rescue excavation north of the mound, where a gas pipeline was to be constructed, and discovered remains of Early Bronze Age ritual activity.

References

Bibliography
 A. Ben-Tor, M. Avisar, Ruhama Bonfíl, I. Zerzetsky and Y. Portugali, A Regional Study of Tel Yoqneʿam and Its Vicinity, Qadmoniot 77–79, 1987 pp. 2–17 (Hebrew)
 Amnon Ben-Tor, Ruhama Bonfíl and Sharon Zuckerman, Tel Qashish: A Village in the Jezreel Valley, Qedem, 2003, pp. 1–451
 Amnon Ben-Tor, Ruhama Bonfil and Sharon Zuckerman, Introduction, pp. 1–4
 Sharon Zuckerman, Tel Qashish and the Jezreel Valley in the Early Bronze Age, pp. 7–9
 Sharon Zuckerman, Tel Qashish in the Early Bronze Age, pp. 178–182
 Amnon Ben-Tor and Ruhama Bonfil, The Stratigraphy And Pottery Assemblages of the Middle And Late Bronze Ages in Area A, pp. 185–276
 Edwin van den Brink, Uzi Ad, Muhammad Hater and Orit Segal, A Hoard of Late Bronze Age Temple Utensils Found at the Foot of Tel Qashish, Qadmoniot 147, 2014, pp. 19–24 (Hebrew)

Further reading
A. Ben-Tor, I. Zerzetsky, Ruhama Bonfíl, H. Greenbern, R. Burnik, Yoqne'am Regional Project – 1984–1987, Hadashot Arkheologiyot 90, 1987, pp. 18–24 (Hebrew)

1920s archaeological discoveries
Tells (archaeology)
Bronze Age sites in Israel
Iron Age sites in Israel
Canaanite cities
Hebrew Bible cities
Former populated places in Southwest Asia
Mousterian
Neanderthal sites